Kleptomania is the fourth and final album by English rock band Mansun, released posthumously in September 2004, following the band's split, as a triple album. The first CD features the material that was to form the basis of the band's next album, which was originally going to be self-titled, and the other 2 CDs feature EP tracks, outtakes and demos.

The band split up while recording songs for the album Kleptomania, leaving unfinished tracks that were never released. An extensive explanation of the break-up has never been made public although a press release by Paul Draper stated that the band had simply "grown apart".

EMI had originally not intended to release the material until an online petition, which gained over 4000 signatures, demonstrated that there was demand for it from fans.
Draper was not in a positive frame of mind about Mansun at the time, but agreed to work on the material after EMI contacted him, on the basis that the material would be released as part of a boxset featuring other material.

Notes

Recording
Despite previewing several tracks from Kleptomania live on what was Mansun's final tour of 2002, Stove King's playing did not feature on any of the tracks which were included. Instead Dominic Chad and Paul Draper shared bass duties.

Kleptomania was recorded at several locations including St. Catherine's Court, a recording studio owned by Jane Seymour, where fellow Parlophone act Radiohead recorded their acclaimed OK Computer album, and at Rockfield Studios, which has been used by acts such as Queen and The Stone Roses. Paul Draper later stated that the band split in the middle of recording "Cry 2 My Face".

Paul Draper states in the sleeve notes that "Good Intentions Heal the Soul" was always intended to conclude the album. The song features one of the singer's most open lyrics throughout Mansun's career; Draper had attempted to write lyrics which were more direct.

Song information
The boxset includes a retrospect by Paul Draper in which he talks about each track included on the album.

Kleptomania contains a number of hidden tracks. The first disc contains an instrumental called "The Dog from Two Doors Down" (credited to "The Nurk Twins"). The third disc contains three: "Thief",  different mix of an earlier EP B-side track; "Witness to an Opera" an instrumental version of a song from the band's second album Six; and "Stupid Open Space" a jazz-funk cover of Wide Open Space (credited to Mike Hunter).

The tracks for Disc 2 were selected by an online poll on the band's official website which allowed fans to choose any of the band's releases whether a non-album single or B-side singles. Paul Draper also chose to include "When the Wind Blows" and "Decisions, Decisions", which weren't in the top 20 tracks voted by fans.

"Slipping Away" was released as a download and 7" only single prior to the full release of Kleptomania. "Getting Your Way" was featured as the B-Side.

In recent interviews Paul Draper stated that if the band had stayed together and released the fourth album properly, they would have issued "Love Remains" as the lead-off single.

"Rock 'n' Roll Loser" was mentioned on fan site Mansunite, and was talked about on there as the possible first single from Little Kix. As mentioned in the sleeve notes of Kleptomania, the band soon lost interest in it and it was left in the vaults until its addition on disc 3 of Kleptomania.

"Shot by Both Sides" is not only a Magazine cover, but also one of the few Mansun songs sung by lead guitarist Dominic Chad.

"South of the Painted Hall" is an unreleased track was recorded in 2001 during the intended sessions for the 4th Mansun album. It was released in 2006 as a free download available to buyers of their compilation album; Legacy: Best Of.

Track listing
All tracks written and composed by Paul Draper; Except where indicated.

Disc one

Note Instrumental track between "Slipping Away" and "Keep Telling Myself" composed and performed by Dominic Chad, from The Parrot Sessions

Disc two

Disc three

Personnel

Mansun

 Paul Draper
 Dominic Chad
 Stove King
 Andie Rathbone

Early band members
Carlton Hibbert (1995–1996)
Mark Swinnerton (1995–1996)
Julian Fenton (1996)

Technical

CD1 The 4th Album Sessions
 Paul Draper – vocals, guitars, bass, keyboards
 Dominic Chad – backing vocals, guitars, bass, keyboards
 Andie Rathbone – drums, percussion
 Richard Rainey and Paul Draper - producer
 Cenzo Townshend - engineer (1-8, 11), mixing (1, 9, 10)
 Barney Chase - engineer (9, 10)
 Paul Draper - mixing (2-8, 11)
 Mike Hunter - mixing (3-7, 11)
 Chris Agnew - drum programming (10)
 The Nurk Twins - performer (12)

CD2 Non-Album Singles, B-Sides and EP-Only tracks
 Paul Draper - producer (1-7, 9, 11, 13-15), string arrangement (3)
 Mike Hunter - assistant engineer (1, 4), engineer (2, 3, 7, 10, 15), mixing (2, 10, 15), recording (5, 6, 9, 12), co-producer (8), producer (10)
 Mark 'Spike' Stent - mixing (1, 3, 9, 11, 14), strings recording (3), producer (9, 11, 14), recording (9, 14)
 Ronnie Stone - engineer (1, 4, 7, 13), mixing (4)
 Dominic Chad - harpsichord (3)
 Stephen Hussey - string arrangement (3)
 Ian Grimble - mixing (5, 6, 12)
 Howard Devoto - producer (6)
 Ian Caple - engineer (7)
 Hugh Padgham - producer (8), mixing (8)
 Anne Dudley - strings scoring (8)

CD3 Rarities, Demos and Unreleased Tracks
 Paul Draper - producer (1-3, 6), mixing (1-3, 6), recording (7-9)
 Hugh Padgham - producer (1)
 Mike Hunter - engineer (1), mixing (1-4, 6), performer (14)
 Richard Rainey - producer (2, 3, 6)
 Cenzo Townshend - engineer (2)
 Barney Chase - engineer (3, 6)
 Cliff Norrell - producer (4, 5), engineer (4, 5), mixing (5)
 Anita Kamath - BBC Radio 1 show producer (10)
 Miti Akhiri - engineer (10)
 Ian Grimble - mixing (11)

Compilation credits
 Paul Draper - compilation, sleeve notes
 Matt Davey - project co-ordination
 Geoff Pesh and Doug Shearer - mastering (at Townhouse)
 Mark Beaumont - foreword
 Pennie Smith, Tom Sheehan, Neil Mersh, Ian Tilton, Ian Jennings, Yosuke Komatsu and Anton Corbijn - photography
 Traffic - design

Charts

References

External links

Kleptomania (disc one) at YouTube (streamed copy where licensed)
Kleptomania (disc two) at YouTube (streamed copy where licensed)
Kleptomania (disc three) at YouTube (streamed copy where licensed)

2004 albums
Mansun albums
Albums recorded at Rockfield Studios